The WGR614L (also known as the WGR614v8) is an 802.11b/g wireless network router created by Netgear. It was officially launched on June 30, 2008.  The WGR614L runs an open source linux firmware and supports the installation of third party packages such as DD-WRT, Tomato, and OpenWrt.

Hardware 
Broadcom BCM5354 240 MHz SoC
4 MB Flash memory
16 MB RAM
16 kB instruction cache
16 kB data cache
1000 byte pre-fetch cache
4 MB CPU cache
2 dBi gain antennas (1 internal and 1 external dipole)
802.11 b/g wireless support
Certified for use with Windows Vista

Features 
Supports installation of OpenWrt, Tomato firmware, and DD-WRT
Supports Wi-Fi Protected Setup (WPS)
Automatically detects ISP type, exposed host (DMZ), MAC address authentication, URL content filtering, logs and email alerts of Internet activity
Static & dynamic routing with TCP/IP, VPN pass-through (IPsec, L2TP), NAT, PPTP, PPPoE, DHCP (client & server)

Applications 

The WGR614L is designed to be used in home or business environments.  It is often used in connection with third-party firmware and solutions, such as SputnikNet and Titan Hotspots.  The router can also be used as a wireless client bridge (utilizing OpenWrt firmware) and as a wireless repeater bridge (using DD-WRT firmware).

External links 
Press Release announcing WGR614L
Official Support Page
List Of WGR614L Resources
The WGR614L at DD-WRT.com
Using the WGR614L As A Wireless Repeater Bridge Using DD-WRT
Netgear_WGR614 Client Resources
Using the WGR614L As a Wireless Client Bridge using OpenWrt Firmware

Firmware downloads
 DD-WRT Router Database (lookup WGR614L).
 Old DD-WRT, Tomato and OpenWrt links over on My Open Router website.

WGR614L
Hardware routers
Linux